The Eswatini National Archives are a Department of the Ministry of Information, Communications & technology. Director is Mr. Nqoba Msibi. The Archives are located in the Lobamba area of Eswatini (formerly Swaziland), along the Mbabane-Manzini road, next to the Houses of Parliament and opposite the Somhlolo National Stadium. They are open Monday to Friday and are closed weekends and public holidays.

See also 
 List of national archives

References

External links 
 Eswatini National Archives

Eswatini